Hora Hora RFC (also known as Hora Hora) is a rugby club based in Whangarei, New Zealand.
Hora Hora is affiliated to the New Zealand Rugby Football Union (NZRU) via the Northland Rugby Football Union (NRFU) and Whangarei City Sub-union.

Location
Hora Hora play their home games at Hora Hora Park located on Te Mai Road, Whangarei, New Zealand.

Club colours
The club colours are maroon & gold.

The Hora Hora playing strip consists of a predominantly maroon jersey with wide gold hoop, maroon shorts and maroon socks with a gold top.

Competitions
The Premier team participates in the NRFU South Zone Premier Competition.

Notable players

 AB Glen Taylor
 AB Norman Berryman
 AB Norman Maxwell
 AB Fred Woodman
 Doug Te Puni

External links
HH RFC Official Site
NRFU Official site
NRFU Fan site

New Zealand rugby union teams
Sport in Whangārei
de:Northland Rugby Football Union
fr:Northland Rugby Union